Demodes conspersa is a species of beetle in the family Cerambycidae. It was described by Per Olof Christopher Aurivillius in 1914 and is known from Borneo.

References

Mesosini
Beetles described in 1914